Pink Lemonade is the second studio album by Australian rock band Closure in Moscow. It was released on 9 May 2014. The track "The Church of the Technochrist" has been released as a single late 2013.

Track listing
 "The Fool" – 1:33
 "Pink Lemonade" – 8:14
 "Neoprene Byzantine" – 3:54
 "Seeds of Gold" – 3:41
 "That Brahmatron Song" – 9:30
 "Dinosaur Boss Battle" – 6:20
 "Mauerbauertraurigkeit" – 7:25
 "The Church of the Technochrist" – 6:46
 "Beckon Fire" – 4:02
 "Happy Days" – 5:38
 "ピンク レモネード" – 3:29

References

2014 albums
Closure in Moscow albums